Grant Mouser may refer to:

 Grant E. Mouser (1868–1949) U.S. Representative from Ohio
 Grant E. Mouser Jr. (1895–1943), U.S. Representative from Ohio